Roy Gelmi (born 1 March 1995) is a Swiss footballer who plays for FC Winterthur.

Personal life
Born in Switzerland, Gelmi is the son of a Dutch mother.

Career statistics

References

1995 births
People from Bülach District
Living people
Swiss men's footballers
Swiss people of Dutch descent
Association football defenders
FC St. Gallen players
FC Thun players
VVV-Venlo players
FC Winterthur players
Swiss Super League players
Eredivisie players
Swiss Challenge League players
Swiss expatriate footballers
Expatriate footballers in the Netherlands
Swiss expatriate sportspeople in the Netherlands
Sportspeople from the canton of Zürich